The Redcliffe Hotel formerly known as Hotel Redcliffe and Redcliff Tower is a hotel situated beside the sea between Paignton Beach and Preston Sands in Paignton, Devon, England. It is a Grade II Listed Building and was first listed in 1951.

References 

Grade II listed buildings in Devon
Hotels in Devon
Buildings and structures in Paignton